Algeciras Balonmano was a Spanish handball team based in Algeciras, Andalusia. The last season, (2007–08) the team played in Liga ASOBAL.

History
Algeciras Balonmano was founded in 1966.

Note:: After of being relegated to División de Honor B at end of 2007-08 season, the club disappears due to the enormous debts.

Statistics 2007/08

Goals:
Valero Rivera - 154 goals
Ricard Reig - 136 goals
Božidar Nadoveza - 69 goals
Catches:
Kostantinos Tsilimparis - 214 catches 27%
Slaviša Stojinović - 100 catches 28%

Notable players
 Valero Rivera Folch
 Nedeljko Jovanović
 Petar Nenadić
 Nenad Peruničić
 Borko Ristovski

Stadium information
Name: - Pabellón Ciudad de Algeciras
City: - Algeciras
Capacity: - 2,300 people
Address: - C/ Susana Marcos, s/n

References

External links
 Algeciras BM Official Website
 Foro y Web del equipo
 Web del Infierno Algecireño, Ultras Algeciras BM
 Documentacion para entrenadores de Balonmano
 Revista digital de la Liga Asobal

Spanish handball clubs
Sports teams in Andalusia
Defunct handball clubs
Handball clubs established in 1974
Handball clubs disestablished in 2008
Sport in Algeciras
1974 establishments in Spain
2008 disestablishments in Spain